The Calcutta School of Music established in 1915 by Phillipe Sandre is an institution in India, in the field of Western Classical music and Contemporary classical music. It was established in the year 1915 by Phillipé Sandré, a musician of considerable calibre, and a contemporary and friend of the famous composer Saint-Saëns. It has a wide-ranging canvas of musical disciplines covering both Indian and Western music, dance, speech training, elocution, and drama. The School provides liberal instruction in musical subjects on one hand, and also arranging orchestral, chamber and solo music training and concerts, as well as music appreciation sessions throughout the year. Many visiting luminaries of the musical world have visited the School throughout its existence. this include maestros Yehudi Menuhin, Isaac Stern and Mstislav Rostropovich. The great sitar maestro Pandit Ravi Shankar inaugurated the faculty of Indian Music & Dance during the year 1975.

Location 
The School was originally located at Wellesley Street in Central Calcutta. In the year 1972, the school moved into its own premises at Sunny Park. Its 90th anniversary is being celebrated in 2005–06. The school operates as a non-profit organization, and is managed by the principal under the guidance of the Governing Committee. 
His Excellency the Governor of West Bengal is a patron of the school

Faculty
Piano
Mr. Kaushik Das             Ms. Mousoomi Nandi
Ms. Chaitali Ganguly        Mr. Tapan Hazra
Mr. Avijit Kundu            Ms. Arpita Chatterjee
Mr. Arup R. Mitra           Mr. Ritayan Biswas
Ms. Sandhya R. Varma        Mr. Biswajit Samaddar
Mr. Alistair M. Quadra      Mr. Pallab Pramanick
Ms. Sanghamitra Mukherjee   Mr. Amitava Chatterjee
Mr. Savio Menezes

Violin
Mr. Subhashis Dey
Mr. Sandip Halder
Mr. Pallab Pramanick
Mr. Tilak Chatterjee
Mr. Joseph Rozario
Mr. Alistair M. Quadra

Electronic Keyboard
Mr. Alistair M. Quadra
Mr. Savio Menezes
Mr. Tapan Hazra
Mr. Amitava Chatterjee
Mr. Kaushik Das
Mr. Sanjib Kumar Das
Mr. Sankhadip Sengupta
Mr. Biswajit Samaddar
Mr. Attreyo Bhattacharya
Ms. Srobona Chakraborty

Saxophone, Flute and Recorder
Mr. Anup Chatterjee

Kodaly Junior Music Classes
Ms. Chaitali Ganguly

Pre Ballet, Modern Contemporary Dance and Salsa
Mr. Sudipta Kundu (Peddro)

Senior and Junior Choir
Ms. Chaitali Ganguly

Western Contemporary Vocals
Mr. Amitava Chatterjee

Communication Skills
Ms. Debjani Gupta

Speech and Drama
Ms. Shuktara Lal
Ms. Katy Lai Roy
Ms. Debjani Gupta

Drum Kit
Mr. Darren Manuel
Mr. Premjit Dutta
Mr. Dipayan Chakraborty

Viola
Mr. Joseph Rozario

Cello
Mr. Suraj K. Dolui

Guitar
Non Classical (including Bass Guitar)    Classical
Mr. Cyrus J. Tata                        Ms. Sraddha Sanghvi
Mr. Soumitra Chatterjee                  Mr. Shyamal K. De
Mr. Gokul Podder                         Ms. Sohini De
Mr. Debasish Sanyal                      Mr. Rajib Ranjit

Indian Music and Performing Arts Section:
Classical Vocal:
Mr. Nabhodeep Chakraborty

See also
Calcutta Chamber Orchestra
Calcutta Symphony Orchestra

The Calcutta Chamber Orchestra
The Calcutta School of Music financially supports a full time orchestra, the Calcutta Chamber Orchestra (CCO), made up of a full fledged string ensemble of professional musicians. The school pays each musician a stipend for each practice session and an honorarium for concert performances. The school tries to organise trainers from overseas to further the skills of these musicians. Conductors have come and stayed for medium term to work with the orchestra on a chosen repertoire culminating in a concert.

The CCO has been performing several times a year at prestigious events and for eminent personalities and foreign dignitaries. It has played for a documentary film for the famous film director Mr. Gautam Ghosh. The Orchestra has recorded a CD with SaReGaMa, sponsored by M Junction, which was released by H.E. The Governor of West Bengal, Shri M.K. Narayanan, on 1 December 2010. The members of the CCO have played in operas like Fakir of Benaras, The Pearl Fishers and La Traviata, produced by the Neemrana Foundation. Members of the CCO have joined in and performed with orchestras in many other cities of India. Selected members of the CCO regularly perform at the lounges of ITC Sonar, Taj Bengal and Park Plaza.

External links 
 
Ballet classes at CSM
Calcutta School of Music

Music schools in India
Universities and colleges in Kolkata
Educational institutions established in 1915
1915 establishments in India
Arts organizations established in 1915